is a 1988 Japanese film directed by Yoji Yamada. It was Japan's submission to the 61st Academy Awards for the Academy Award for Best Foreign Language Film, but was not accepted as a nominee. It was also entered into the 39th Berlin International Film Festival.

Cast
 Hiroko Yakushimaru as Fusako Nakahara
 Nakamura Hashinosuke III as Kosuke Shima
 Toshirō Yanagiba as Onkel, Keigo Hinoki
 Toshinori Omi as Arles, Sadaichi Takai
 Tetta Sugimoto as Gan, Iwao Ishido
 Shinobu Sakagami as Chopinski, Choichiro Saeki
 Eri Ishida as Sakiko Taniguchi, Prostitute
 Keiko Awaji as Coffee shop's madame
 Nakamura Shikan VII (Special appearance) as Kosuke today
 Chieko Baisho as Kosuke's Mother, Tamiko Shima
 Kiyoshi Atsumi as Havaosuke the dormitory cook

See also
List of submissions to the 61st Academy Awards for Best Foreign Language Film
List of Japanese submissions for the Academy Award for Best Foreign Language Film

References

External links

1988 films
Films directed by Yoji Yamada
1980s Japanese-language films
1980s Japanese films